The 1926–27 Harvard Crimson men's ice hockey season was the 29th season of play for the program.

Season
Before the season began, Harvard made a decision to end their annual contests against Princeton. The two teams had played one another, often multiple times, every year since 1901 with exception of the 1918 campaign (due to World War I). The problem was that Princeton hadn't challenged for a league championship since before the War, which was also the last time they had beaten Harvard in the season series. Harvard was also able to fill the gap in their schedule with the return of Brown after a 20-year hiatus.

A bigger issue that Harvard had to contend with was a new rule limiting each team to just 12 players per game. While that didn't affect most programs, the Crimson had been routinely using many alternates during their games, resulting in 15 or more players in some contests. Regardless of the new limitations, Harvard began the season well. After a solid win over MIT the team played three games against Canadian colleges and finished with a split decision, a difficult task considering the quality of their opponents. Unfortunately, the team also lost sophomore forward Henry Crosby to appendicitis just before the second Toronto game.

After proving their international mettle, Harvard played its first ever western opponent when it hosted Notre Dame. The Crimson dominated the Irish 7–0 but little beyond that could be established from the game as Notre Dame wasn't a particularly strong team that season. Harvard avenged a loss from the year before with a hard-fought victory over Boston University then entered their showdown against Yale with a chance at another intercollegiate title. The Crimson offense overpowered the Elis in the first game, and after securing a season-series win over Dartmouth with a tie, Harvard finished the season at the newly-refurbished New Haven Arena. Harvard built a 2-goal lead and then played their typical stifling defense to earn a 2–1 win and finish the season undefeated against collegiate opponents.

A day after the victory, head coach Edward Bigelow announced that he was resigning from his position to devote himself fully to his business career. Though his tenure was short, few could claim as much success as Bigelow did with two intercollegiate championships and a record of 25–8–2 (22–3–1 against collegiate opponents).

Roster

Standings

Schedule and Results

|-
!colspan=12 style=";" | Regular Season

References

Harvard Crimson men's ice hockey seasons
Harvard
Harvard
Harvard
Harvard
Harvard